The Municipality of Turnišče is a municipality in Slovenia. The seat of the municipality is the town of Turnišče.

Settlements
In addition to the namesake town, the municipality also includes the settlements of Gomilica, Nedelica, and Renkovci.

References

External links

Municipality of Turnišče on Geopedia

Turnisce